Ina Peters (1928–2004) was an Austrian stage and film actress.

Selected filmography
 Bon Voyage (1954)
 André and Ursula (1955)
 Kitty and the Great Big World (1956)
 Charley's Aunt (1956)
 The Spessart Inn (1958)
 Stage Fright (1960)

References

Bibliography
 Goble, Alan. The Complete Index to Literary Sources in Film. Walter de Gruyter, 1999.

External links

1928 births
2004 deaths
Austrian film actresses
Actresses from Vienna